The Quemadero (Quemadero De Tablada) was a  place of execution built by the first inquisitors at Seville in 1481; it was decorated with four large statues representing prophets. The architect, as a follower of Judaism, was one of the first to fall victim to the Inquisition. The Quemadero was destroyed in 1809, whereas the material was used for fortifications during the French invasion of Andalusia.

References

Spanish Inquisition
1481 establishments in Spain
History of Seville
1809 disestablishments in Europe
1800s disestablishments in Spain
Buildings and structures in Seville